The Astroduck is a 1966 Warner Bros. Looney Tunes cartoon directed by Robert McKimson. The short was released on January 1, 1966, and stars Daffy Duck and Speedy Gonzales.

Synopsis
Daffy buys a house in Mexico,  but Speedy will not leave the house. At the end Daffy blows his house up and Speedy says,
"We got a new astroduck!" Actually, the house can already be seen floating outer space during the opening credits of the cartoon.

Crew
 Director: Robert McKimson
 Story: Tony Benedict, Bill Danch, Tedd Pierce
 Animation: Bob Matz, Manny Perez, Warren Batchelder, Don Williams, George Grandpre, Norm McCabe
 Layout: Dick Ung
 Backgrounds: Tom O'Loughlin
 Film Editor: Lee Gunther
 Voice Characterizations: Mel Blanc
 Music: Bill Lava
 Produced by: David H. DePatie and Friz Freleng

See also
List of American films of 1966
 The Golden Age of American animation
 List of Daffy Duck cartoons

Sources

External links

Looney Tunes shorts
Warner Bros. Cartoons animated short films
1966 films
1966 animated films
1966 short films
Films directed by Robert McKimson
Daffy Duck films
Speedy Gonzales films
Films scored by William Lava
1960s Warner Bros. animated short films
1960s English-language films